In Canada, the 1954 Governor General's Awards for Literary Merit were the eighteenth such awards.  The awards in this period had no monetary prize but were an honour for the authors.

Winners
Fiction: Igor Gouzenko, The Fall of a Titan.
Poetry or Drama: P. K. Page, The Metal and the Flower.
Non-Fiction: Hugh MacLennan, Thirty and Three.
Non-Fiction: A.R.M. Lower, This Most Famous Stream.
Juvenile: Marjorie Wilkins Campbell, The Nor'westers.

Governor General's Awards
Governor General's Awards
Governor General's Awards